Herbie Nichols Trio is an album by jazz pianist Herbie Nichols, featuring performances recorded in 1955–56 and released on the Blue Note label in 1956.

Reception
Although originally unheralded at the time of release, Nichol's Blue Note recordings have gained recognition as highly original and ground-breaking compositions and performances. The AllMusic review by Scott Yanow awarded Nichols' The Complete Blue Note Recordings, released in 1997, a five-star rating and stated: "The music is virtually unclassifiable, and although largely straight-ahead, sounds unlike anything produced by Herbie Nichols' contemporaries. Essential music".<ref name="AllMusic">Yanow, S. [ AllMusic Review: The Complete Blue Note Recordings: Herbie Nichols] accessed November 30, 2010</ref>  

Track listingAll compositions by Herbie Nichols, except as indicated.''
 "The Gig" - 4:27
 "House Party Starting" - 5:41
 "Chit-Chatting" - 4:04
 "Lady Sings the Blues" (Billie Holiday, Herbie Nichols) - 4:25
 "Terpsichore" - 4:01
 "Spinning Song" - 4:56
 "Query" - 3:29
 "Wildflower" - 4:06
 "Hangover Triangle" - 4:05
 "Mine" (George Gershwin, Ira Gershwin) - 4:03
Recorded at Rudy Van Gelder Studio, Hackensack, New Jersey, on August 1, 1955 (tracks 1-4 & 9), August 7, 1955 (track 5), and April 19, 1956 (tracks 6-8 & 10)

Personnel
Herbie Nichols - piano
Teddy Kotick (tracks 6-8 & 10), Al McKibbon (tracks 1-4 & 9) - bass
Max Roach - drums

References

Blue Note Records albums
Herbie Nichols albums
1956 albums
Albums produced by Alfred Lion
Albums recorded at Van Gelder Studio